The Bulgarian Turks in Turkey represent a community of Bulgarian Turks, who immigrated over the years from Bulgaria to Turkey. They are notable in Turkey for being descendants of Balkan Turks who had to escape persecution. and moreover, part of them continue to be dual citizens of Bulgaria and Turkey, which makes them a natural bridge between both countries.

Origins
Bulgarian Turks are descendants of Asian settlers who came across the narrows of the Dardanelles and the Bosporus following the Ottoman conquest of the Balkans in the late 14th and early 15th centuries, as well as Bulgarian converts to Islam who became Turkified during the centuries of Ottoman rule in Bulgaria. It has also been suggested that some Turks living today in Bulgaria may be direct ethnic descendants of earlier medieval Pecheneg, Oğuz, and Cuman Turkic tribes. The Turkish community became an ethnic minority when the Principality of Bulgaria was established after the Russo-Turkish War of 1877–1878.

History of resettlement in Turkey

Famous Bulgarian Turks in Turkey
 Naim Süleymanoğlu
 Halil Mutlu
 Ahmet Fikri Tüzer
 Neriman Özsoy
 Yıldız İbrahimova
 Hakan Yıldız
 Hulusi Kentmen
 Şaziye Moral
 Ali Osman Sönmez
 Gülhan Şen
 Ciguli
 Şoray Uzun

See also
Turks in Bulgaria
Crimean Tatars in Bulgaria
Bulgarian Muslims  
Muslim Roma
Roma in Bulgaria
Bulgarian diaspora
1989 expulsion of Turks from Bulgaria
Bulgaria–Turkey relations

References

 
Ethnic groups in Turkey

Demographics of the Ottoman Empire
European diaspora in Turkey
Bulgarian people of Turkish descent